William Henry Lipscomb (20 November 1846 – 9 April 1918) was an English barrister and first-class cricketer, a right-handed batsman who bowled right-arm roundarm medium pace.

Life
He was the eldest son of William Henry Lipscomb of Winchester, and was educated at Marlborough College from 1860. He went up to University College, Oxford in 1865, graduating B.A. in 1870. He was admitted to Lincoln's Inn in 1868, and was called to the bar there in 1872.

Lipscomb died at Clapham, London on 9 April 1918.

Cricketer
Lipscomb made his first-class debut for Hampshire in 1866 against Surrey. He played four first-class matches for Hampshire, with his final match against Kent in 1867. Additionally in 1867, he played a single first-class match for the Gentlemen of the South against the Gentlemen of the North.

In 1868 Lipscomb played for Oxford University against the Marylebone Cricket Club, playing his second and final first-class match for the University in the same season and winning his Blue against Cambridge University.

Lipscomb was also a well-known oarsman.

References

External links
William Lipscomb at Cricinfo
William Lipscomb at CricketArchive

1846 births
1918 deaths
English barristers
Cricketers from Winchester
English cricketers
Hampshire cricketers
Alumni of University College, Oxford
Oxford University cricketers
Gentlemen of the South cricketers
19th-century English lawyers